Fort Bragg is a military installation in North Carolina.

Fort Bragg may also refer to:
Fort Bragg, California, a city in Northern California
Fort Bragg fever, a bacterial zoonotic disease